Dictydiaethalium is a genus of slime molds composed of D. plumbeum and D. dictyosporum.

References

Myxogastria